War Eagle Creek is a stream in Benton, Washington and Madison counties of northwest Arkansas, United States, that is a tributary of the White River. 


Description
The stream flows northwest passing under and then running parallel to Arkansas Route 23 passing the communities of Witter and Aurora. It flows past the east side of Huntsville and crosses under U.S. Route 412 northeast of Harmony. It turns to the northwest as passes the south side of Withrow Springs State Park and under Route 23 again. It continues passing under Arkansas Highway 45 to the north of Hindsville and passes through the northeast corner of Washington County and into Benton County. The stream passes under Arkansas Highway 303 just west of War Eagle and makes a sharp turn (incised meander) to the south. The stream enters the waters of Beaver Lake just prior to re-entering Washington County. Prior to the creation of Beaver Lake, the stream entered the White River about three miles to the west-southwest.

The creek has the name of War Eagle, an Indian chieftain.

See also

 List of rivers of Arkansas

References

External links

Rivers of Arkansas
Bodies of water of the Ozarks
Tributaries of the White River (Arkansas–Missouri)
Rivers of Washington County, Arkansas
Rivers of Benton County, Arkansas
Bodies of water of Madison County, Arkansas